Daniel F. Roses, M.D. is the Jules Leonard Whitehill Professor of Surgery and Oncology of the New York University School of Medicine and a Senior Attending Surgeon at Tisch Hospital of the New York University Medical Center.

Following his training in surgery at the New York University-Bellevue Medical Center, he served on active duty as a lieutenant commander with the Medical Corps of the United States Navy, returning to the New York University School of Medicine as a clinical fellow of the American Cancer Society.

Roses is the author or co-author of over 250 published manuscripts, abstracts, and chapters, and three books, including Cutaneous Malignant Melanoma (W.B. Saunders) and Breast Cancer (Elsevier / Churchill Livingstone) now in its 2nd edition. His research interests are the surgical and systemic treatment of cancer and the surgical treatment of thyroid and parathyroid disease. He is the Director of the Breast Cancer Discovery Fund and the Cancer Surgery Research Fund at the NYU School of Medicine and the Principal Investigator at NYU of the National Cancer Institute Multicenter Sentinel Lymphadenectomy Trial for malignant melanoma.

Awards and Honors 
Roses has received the Solomon A. Berson Alumni Achievement Award in Clinical Science from the NYU School of Medicine (2005); the Albert Gallatin Medical Alumni Award of the NYU School of Medicine (1997); the Distinguished Teacher Award of the NYU School of Medicine (1980,1981,1983,1991, and 1993); the Great Teacher Award of New York University (1993); the Manhattan Breast Cancer Awareness Award (1997); the Gender Equity Award of the American Medical Women's Association (1998); the Physician of the Year Award of the Rambam Medical Center in Israel (1999); the Daniel G. Miller Excellence in Medicine Award of the Israel Cancer Research Fund (2011); and the Wings of Hope Humanitarian Award of the Melanoma Research Foundation (2011).

Roses is a Fellow of the American College of Surgeons and has served as the New York State Chairman for its Commission on Cancer. He has served as President of the New York Surgical Society (2008–09). He is a member of over twenty professional societies, including the American Surgical Association, Alpha Omega Alpha, the Society of Surgical Oncology, the Society of University Surgeons, the American Association for Cancer Research, and the American Society of Clinical Oncology.

Published works
 Cutaneous Malignant Melanoma (W.B. Saunders) 
 Breast Cancer (ElsevierChurchill Livingstone) eBook  Hardcover

References

American surgeons
New York University faculty
Living people
United States Navy Medical Corps officers
Year of birth missing (living people)